William Forrest "Woody" Stinespring (16 March 1929, Charlottesville, Virginia – 15 May 2012) was an American mathematician, specializing in operator theory. He is known for the Stinespring factorization theorem.

While studying in Harvard University, Stinespring twice became a Putnam fellow, in 1947 and 1949. After graduating from Harvard University with a bachelor's degree, Stinespring received his Ph.D. from the University of Chicago in 1957. His thesis Integration for gages and duality theorems was written under the supervision of Irving Segal. Stinespring was a visiting scholar at the Institute for Advanced Study from 1957 to 1959. After teaching at the University of Illinois at Urbana-Champaign, MIT, and the University of Chicago, he became in 1966 a professor at the University of Illinois at Chicago, retiring there as professor emeritus in 1999. He wrote 7 papers with David Shale.

According to William Arveson:

W. Forrest Stinespring's father was William Franklin Stinespring (b. 1901), who was a professor at Duke University Divinity School from 1936 to 1971.

Selected publications
 (This article has over 1600 citations.) 

 1959 (translated into Russian by S. G. Gindikin Matematika, 1961, volume 5, issue 3, pages 81–94)

References

1929 births
2012 deaths
Writers from Charlottesville, Virginia
20th-century American mathematicians
21st-century American mathematicians
Operator theorists
Harvard University alumni
University of Chicago alumni
University of Illinois Chicago faculty
Putnam Fellows